Donnelly is an Irish surname.

Donnelly may also refer to:

Places

Australia
 Donnelly River, Western Australia, a village

Canada
 Donnelly, Alberta

United States
 Donnelly, Alaska
 Donnelly, Idaho
 Donnelly, Minnesota
 Donnelly Township, Marshall County, Minnesota
 Donnelly Township, Stevens County, Minnesota

People with the given name
 Donnelly Rhodes (1937–2018), Canadian actor

Entertainment
 The Black Donnellys, 2007 American television drama that debuted on NBC